André Gevers (born 19 August 1952) is a retired amateur Dutch track cyclist who was active between 1973 and 1982. He won the amateur road race at the 1975 UCI Road World Championships, as well as individual stages of the Olympia's Tour (1975), Circuit de la Sarthe (1976 and 1977) and Ronde van Nederland (1976).

In 1978 and 1979 he rode as a professional for TI–Raleigh–McGregor.

References

1952 births
Living people
Dutch male cyclists
People from Schijndel
UCI Road World Championships cyclists for the Netherlands
Cyclists from North Brabant
20th-century Dutch people
21st-century Dutch people